Takizawa (written: 滝沢, 滝澤 or 瀧澤) is a Japanese surname. Notable people with the surname include:

, Japanese biathlete
, Japanese film director
, Japanese actor and singer
, Japanese freestyle skier
, Japanese model, television personality and actress
, Japanese voice actress
, Japanese footballer
, Japanese volleyball player
, Japanese gravure idol, actress and singer
, Japanese actor
, Japanese volleyball player
, Japanese footballer
, Japanese professional wrestler

Japanese-language surnames